Asab (Nama: new thing) is a settlement in the ǁKaras Region of southern Namibia. It is situated on the B1 national road about halfway between Mariental and Keetmanshoop.  east of Asab is the Mukurob rock pinnacle, a tourist attraction that collapsed in 1988.

Asab belongs to the Berseba electoral constituency. The settlement features a petrol station, a shop, and a small hotel, although none of these businesses is  operational, to the effect that the place has been described as a "ghost village". Asab Railway Station is a stop on the TransNamib railway line from Windhoek to Keetmanshoop.

 outside Asab there is the community of Groendoring (literally , referring to the Torchwood of the Balanites genus), with a privately built church and a now-defunct pre-primary school.

References

Populated places in the ǁKaras Region